Cyncynopol  is a village in the administrative district of Gmina Biłgoraj, within Biłgoraj County, Lublin Voivodeship, in eastern Pole land.

The village has a population of 36.

References

Villages in Biłgoraj County